Tusenfryd (lit. "Thousand Joys", also Common Daisy) is an amusement park at Vinterbro, Norway.  The park is located 20 kilometers south of Oslo. Two of the longest motorway corridors in Norway, E6 and E18, meet nearby Tusenfryd and the park is located on the west side near where they meet.  SpeedMonster, SuperSplash, ThunderCoaster and SpaceShot make the park visible from the motorway. The park was officially opened on 11 June 1988, after a construction period of 18 months. The park is owned by Parques Reunidos S.A., located in Madrid, Spain. Bjørn Håvard Solli is the park's CEO. The park has 34 attractions and has 500,000 visitors per year.

History
From 1950 to 1985 the park's area belonged to a zoo. When the zoo closed, two entrepreneurs, Tor Erling Pettersen and Terje Buer, signed a lease to rent 115 acres of the zoo's former land and built a theme park. Eighteen months later, on 11 June 1988, Tusenfryd opened and attracted almost half a million people in its first season (a number of visitors that has remained steady ever since). Initially the park was owned by the companies Park Invest and Visit Investments but in 2008 the park was sold to the Spanish-based Parque Reunidos which also owns Norway's largest water park Bø Sommerland.

The Park
Even though Tusenfryd is not divided into specifically themed areas there is a section called Morgan Kane Town (opened in 1993), another section is called Vikingland (opened in 1995) and there is a small Fairy Tale Land (opened in 2000). The park's mascot is called Fryd. The park has one of the most innovative entrances of any amusement park (an uphill ride on an escalator through one of the loops of the Speed Monster's roller coaster). The park has flower beds and it is located on a hilly forested area requiring a lot of uphill walking. The actual park occupies 55 acres.

Rides

Roller Coasters

Water Rides 
 Tømmerstupet - A 330 meters long log flume ride that ends in a 7 meter high drop. Opened in 1988, made by Arrow Dynamics with an on-ride photo camera.
 Badefrydelven a waterslide
 Ragnarok - A rapids ride, made by Hafema with many drops and scenery. Opened in 2016.

Other Rides 
 Kanofarten - swinging pirate ship; height limit 1,1m / 1,2m alone. Opened in 2008.
 SpaceShot - Double Shot. The 65m tall /  tower is a standard S&S Power Space Shot. Opened in 1998.
 The SkyCoaster - Skycoaster. an attraction designed to replicate the feeling of skydiving. The ride is not included with standard admission. Opened in 1996, made by SkyCoaster.
 SpinSpider - a giant swing, opened in 2009; height limit 1,4m. Zamperla.
 Sverre - Wave Swinger; height limit 1,1m. Opened in 1988. Zierer.
 Store Radiobiler - Bumper cars; height limit 1,2m / 1,4m alone. Opened in 1988, SBF Visa.
Thor's Hammer is a motion-based 3D dark ride made by ETF Ride Systems and P&P Projects that opened in June 2013.
 Nightmare - a 5D Shooting dark ride opened in 2010 replacing spøkelsesslottet. Made by Alterface.

Kiddie Rides 
 Ballongferden - mini Ferris wheel; opened in 2005. Zamperla.
 Bestefars Bil - on track vintage cars, opened in 2005.
 Eventyrstien - obstacle course that opened in 1994.
 Finkarusellen - carousel, opened in 1988.
 Fjernestyrte Båter, remote controlled boats.
 Froghopper - mini drop tower, opened in 2000. Zamperla.
 Frydshus, visit the park's mascot Fryd in his new house that opened in 2012.
 Fryds Lekeplass - play area.
 Marihøna - merry go round, opened in 2012. Technical Park.
 MC Hopp - circular bikes, opened in 1988.
 Små Radiobiler - junior bumper cars, opened in 1988. Zamperla.
 Sommerfuglene - magic bikes, opened in 2012. Zamperla.
 Stubbesnurr - spinning tea cups, opened in 2012. Technical Park.
 Traffikfryd - electric cars for kids to drive, opened in 1990.

Water Park 
The small water park Badefryd is included in the admission price, it opened in 2000.
Badefrydelven is a tube ride (2000); height limit 1,2m.
Lagoon is a pool with children's water slides, opened in 2000.
Trippelsklia has 3 body slides, opened in 2002.

Timeline 
It was officially opened on 11 June 1988, and took 18 months to build. TusenFryd is the only amusement park inhabitants of Oslo can visit on a one-day trip, giving it an advantage in the Norwegian amusement-park business. As of 2009, TusenFryd averaged 470,000 visitors a year, with a revenue of 174,4 million NOK a year.

 1988 - Official opening of TusenFryd by Åse Kleveland
 1990 - Blekkspruten spinner opens
 1992 - Opening of Tunet, Bungee jumping, climbing wall, driving range and Off-road biketrack
 1993 - Official opening of Morgan Kane City
 1994 - "Spøkelsesslottet" opens
 1995 - VikingLand opens
 1996 - Den Alle Minste Roller Coaster opens
 1997 - Bungee JuMping is renamed to SkyCoaster
 1998 - Opening of SpaceShot launch tower
 1999 - Opening of MiniFryd
 2000 - Fantasy Farm and BadeFryd opens
 2001 - ThunderCoaster opens
 2002 - Trippelsklia opens in addition to BadeFryd
 2003 - Official opening of Super Splash
 2004 - Official opening of RollOver
 2005 - Ballongferden, Bestefars Bil
 2006 - Speed Monster opens
 2008 - Kanofarten swinging ships opens
 2009 - SpinSpider giant swing opens
 2010 - Nightmare 5D Dark Ride Shoot Out opens
 2011 - Skippertaket opens
 2012 - Western Express Roller Coaster opens as well as Mariehöne, Sommerfuglene, Stubbesnurr
 2013 - Thor's Hammer opens
 2016 - Ragnarok (Rapid River) opens
 2018 - Steampunk Hunters opens

See also 
 Tourism in Norway

References

External links 

 Official website in English | in Norwegian

Entertainment companies of Norway
Amusement parks in Norway
Parques Reunidos
Ås, Akershus
1988 establishments in Norway
Amusement parks opened in 1988